Bigi may refer to:

Surname
 Emilio Bigi (1910–1969), Paraguayan singer
 Federica Bigi, Sammarinese diplomat and politician
 Ikaros Bigi (born 1947), German theoretical physicist
 Luca Bigi (born 1991), Italian rugby union player

Other uses
 Bigi Jackson (born 2002), son of Michael Jackson, formerly known as "Blanket"
 Palleschi, also known as bigi, partisans of the Medici family in Florence
 Bigi, a village in Nigeria - see List of villages in Bauchi State
 Bigi, a deconsecrated church in Grosseto, Tuscany, Italy

See also
 Bigi Bigi, original Aboriginal name of Abbotsford, New South Wales, Australia